The Lithuanian and Samogitian Charitable Society ( or simply labdariai) was a charitable society active in Saint Petersburg in 1892–1918. For a time, it was only legal Lithuanian organization in the Russian Empire. It provided financial support to Lithuanian students and maintained a Lithuanian school attached to the Church of St. Catherine. It also organized Lithuanian cultural evenings with amateur theater performances, dances, songs. In 1895, it staged the first public Lithuanian play in the Russian Empire.

Activities
At the end of the 19th century, Lithuanians moved to Saint Petersburg, then capital of the Russian Empire, for jobs and education. In 1900, Varpas estimated that there were about 10,000 Lithuanians in the city. The government approval for a charitable society was received on 25 September 1892. The founding meeting took place on 21 October 1892.

The society provided stipends and other support (e.g. food, clothing, shelter, aid in job search) to struggling Lithuanian and Samogitian students. It also maintained a Lithuanian school, hall for gatherings and lectures, small library with a reading room, and a choir. The school was attached to the Church of St. Catherine and educated about a hundred students (sixty boys and forty girls). When the Lithuanian press ban was lifted in 1905, the society supported the publication of Lietuvių laikraštis, the first Lithuanian periodical published legally in the Russian Empire.

The society charged an annual membership fee of six Russian rubles. To raise further funds, the society organized quarterly cultural evenings with Lithuanian plays (usually, simple comedies), dances, songs by the choir. The first such evening was held in 1892 without proper permits in an apartment of a Lithuanian doctor. In February 1893, the first public evening was attended by 400 people. On 31 March 1895, it performed the first public Lithuanian play – a translated comedy Žentas dėl parodos (Son-in-Law for Show) by Józef Bliziński about a pretentious peasant family that wanted a noble son-in-law. One of the plays, depicting the end of the harvest in Lithuania, involved more than 50 performers, singers and dancers in Lithuanian national costumes. Performers during these evenings included brothers Kipras and Mikas Petrauskas, Stasys Šimkus,  who later became professional performers in independent Lithuania. Other participants included future painter Adomas Varnas and ophthalmologist Petras Avižonis.

The charitable society was dominated by wealthier Lithuanians and members of the intelligentsia. Its membership fee was unaffordable to most Lithuanian workers. Linguist Kazimieras Būga was secretary and active member of this society. This society was still too expensive and a third society known as the Lithuanian Mutual Aid Society for the Poor of Saint Petersburg ( or simply mažturčiai) was established in 1904.

In ten years from 1893 to 1902, the charitable society raised almost 25,000 rubles (4,410 rubles from membership fees, 15,560 rubles from cultural evenings, and other donations). At the same time, it spent 3,828 rubles to support students, 3,036 rubles on other charitable work, and 9,626 rubles to organize the cultural evenings.

Members
The society was never a large organization. It had about 60 members in 1896, 100 in 1899, and 300 in 1917. Its founders and active members included , Jonas Mačiulis (Maironis), Aleksandras Dambrauskas (Adomas Jakštas).

The honorary chairman of the society was  who obtained government approval for the society. Among its honorary members were Bishop of Samogitia , Bishop of Lutsk-Zhytomyr , professors Ignotas Baltrušis and Jonas Mačiulis (Maironis) of the Saint Petersburg Roman Catholic Theological Academy, secretary of the Mogilev Archdiocese .

Chairmen
The society was chaired by:
 Petras Vileišis (1892–1895)
 Vincas Matulaitis (1895–1917)
 Blažiejus Česnys (1917)
 Adomas Spurga (1917)
 Gustavas Feterauskas (1918)

See also
 Žiburėlis – illegal Lithuanian society established in 1893 to support students

References

1892 establishments in the Russian Empire
Organizations established in 1892
1918 disestablishments in Russia
Organizations disestablished in 1918
History of Lithuania (1795–1918)
Organizations based in Saint Petersburg